Rugby Public School District No. 5, also known as Rugby Public Schools, is a school district headquartered in Rugby, North Dakota.

It operates two schools: Ely Elementary School and Rugby High School.

In Pierce County the district serves Rugby, Balta, Barton, and Orrin. Within Benson County the district serves Knox. It also includes a section of Rolette County.

History
In 1911 there was a mass gathering of voters to where the school leadership addressed issues.

In 1972 the district was seeking to change its taxation to a six mill total increase so that it could expand the secondary school building.

Dale Bader became the superintendent on July 1, 1976.

In 2019 Wolford School District was disestablished. Rugby Public Schools received a part of the district.

References

External links
 Rugby Public Schools
School districts in North Dakota
Education in Benson County, North Dakota
Education in Pierce County, North Dakota
Education in Rolette County, North Dakota